Alan Baker (born 22 June 1944) is a former English footballer. He played for several teams including Walsall F.C. and Aston Villa F.C. He was born in Tipton, Staffordshire.

Career
Baker joined Aston Villa Football club as a schoolboy. He went on to appear 109 times (92 League, 17 Cup) for the club, scoring 17 goals.

References

1944 births
Living people
Sportspeople from Tipton
Association football forwards
Aston Villa F.C. players
Walsall F.C. players
English footballers